Sabine Lisicki and Samantha Stosur were the defending champions but decided not to participate.
Iveta Benešová and Barbora Záhlavová-Strýcová won the tournament defeating Julia Görges and Anna-Lena Grönefeld 6–4, 7–5 in the final.

Seeds

Draw

Draw

References
 Main Draw

Porsche Tennis Grand Prix - Doubles
2012 Doubles